Tactical or battlefield intelligence became vital to both sides in the field during the American Civil War. Units of spies and scouts reported directly to the commanders of armies in the field, providing details on troop movements and strengths. The distinction between spies and scouts was one that had life or death consequences: if a suspect was seized while in disguise and not in his army's uniform, he was often sentenced to be hanged. A spy named Will Talbot, a member of the 35th Battalion, Virginia Cavalry, was left behind in Gettysburg after his battalion had passed through the borough on June 26–27, 1863. He was captured, taken to Emmitsburg, Maryland, and executed on orders of Brig. Gen. John Buford.

Confederate spying
Intelligence-gathering for the Confederates was focused on Alexandria, Virginia, and the surrounding area.

Thomas Jordan created a network of agents that included Rose O'Neal Greenhow. Greenhow delivered reports to Jordan via the “Secret Line,” the name for the system used to get letters, intelligence reports, and other documents across the Potomac and Rappahannock rivers to Confederate officials.

The Confederacy's Signal Corps was devoted primarily to communications and intercepts, but it also included a covert agency called the Confederate Secret Service Bureau, which ran espionage and counter-espionage operations in the North including two networks in Washington.

Confederate spies

Joseph Baden
Fannie Battle
John Yates Beall
Belle Boyd
William Bryant
James Dunwoody Bulloch
Confederate Secret Service
Sam Davis
David Owen Dodd
Nancy Hart Douglas
Zora Fair
Antonia Ford
Mary Jane Green
Rose O'Neal Greenhow
Thomas Harbin
Henry Thomas Harrison
Elizabeth Carraway Howland
Annie Jones
Thomas A. Jones
Thomas Jordan
Alexander Keith Jr.
Joseph Clinton Millsap
Virginia Bethel Moon
Samuel Mudd
William Norris
Emeline Piggott
Sarah Slater
Richard Thomas (Zarvona)
 William Orton Williams

Union spying

The Union's intelligence-gathering initiatives were decentralized. Allan Pinkerton worked for Maj. Gen. George B. McClellan and created the United States Secret Service. Lafayette C. Baker conducted intelligence and security work for Lieutenant General Winfield Scott, commander-in-chief of the U.S. Army. President Abraham Lincoln hired William Alvin Lloyd to spy in the South and report to Lincoln directly.

As a brigadier general in Missouri, Ulysses S. Grant was ordered by Maj. Gen. John C. Frémont to start an intelligence organization. Grant came to understand the power of intelligence and later made Brig. Gen. Grenville M. Dodge the head of his intelligence operations that covered an area from Mississippi to Georgia with as many as one hundred secret agents.

Maj. Gen. Joseph Hooker, who became commander of the Army of the Potomac in January 1863, ordered his deputy provost marshal, Col. George H. Sharpe, to create a unit to gather intelligence. Sharpe set up what he called the Bureau of Military Information and was aided by John C. Babcock, who had worked for Allan Pinkerton and had made maps for George B. McClellan. Sharpe's bureau produced reports based on information collected from agents, prisoners of war, refugees, Southern newspapers, documents retrieved from battlefield corpses, and other sources. When Grant began his siege of Petersburg in June 1864, Sharpe had become Grant's intelligence chief.

The most useful military intelligence of the American Civil War was probably provided to Union officers by slaves and smugglers. Intelligence provided by slaves and blacks was called black dispatches.

Union spies

Mary Elizabeth Bowser
Charles C. Carpenter
George Curtis
Pauline Cushman
Grenville Dodge
Sarah Emma Edmonds
Abraham Galloway
Philip Henson
William J. Lawton
Hattie Lawton
Pryce Lewis
Allan Pinkerton
Albert D. Richardson
John Scobell
Harriet Tubman
Elizabeth Van Lew
Kate Warne
Timothy Webster

References

Bibliography
 Fishel, E. C., The Secret War for The Union: The Untold Story of Military Intelligence in the Civil War. Boston, Houghton Mifflin Co, 1996. 
 Quarles, B., The African American in the Civil War. Boston, Little, Brown, 1953.
 Rose, P. K., The Civil War: Black American Contributions to Union Intelligence.Black Dispatches: Black American Contributions to Union Intelligence During the Civil War.] Washington, D.C., Center for the Study of Intelligence, Central Intelligence Agency, 1999.
 United States Government, Intelligence in the Civil War. Washington, D.C., Central Intelligence Agency, 2005.
Swanson, James L., Manhunt: The 12-Day Chase for Lincoln's Killer. New York, HarperCollins, 2006.  
Search | eHISTORY

Further reading

External links
Espionage in the Civil War
William J. Lawton killed 1864

 

American Civil War espionage